The 1982 UC Davis football team represented the University of California, Davis as a member of the Northern California Athletic Conference (NCAC) during the 1982 NCAA Division II football season. Led by 13th-year head coach Jim Sochor, UC Davis compiled an overall record of 12–1 with a mark of 5–0 in conference play, winning the NCAC title for the 12th consecutive season. 1982 was the team's 13th consecutive winning season. The Aggies advanced to the NCAA Division II Football Championship playoffs, where they beat  in the quarterfinals and North Dakota State in the semifinals before losing to Southwest Texas State in the Palm Bowl, the NCAA Division II title game. The team outscored its opponents 405 to 164 for the season. The Aggies played home games at Toomey Field in Davis, California.

Schedule

NFL Draft
Quarterback Ken O'Brien was selected by the New York Jets with the 24th overall pick in the 1983 NFL Draft.

References

UC Davis
UC Davis Aggies football seasons
Northern California Athletic Conference football champion seasons
UC Davis Aggies football